The Šiška District, or simply Šiška, is the most populous district of the City Municipality of Ljubljana, the capital of Slovenia. It is named after the former villages of Spodnja Šiška and Zgornja Šiška.

Geography
The Šiška District is bounded on the west A2 Freeway, on the north by the H3 Expressway, on the east by the railroad to Kamnik, and on the south by the railroad to Sežana, a line across Rožnik Hill, and Youth Street (Mladinska ulica). The district includes the former villages of Koseze, Spodnja Šiška, and Zgornja Šiška.

Cultural heritage
Several cultural monuments are located in Šiška, among them St. Bartholomew's Church, built in the 13th century and remodeled between 1933 and 1936 by the Slovene architect Jože Plečnik. Jože Plečnik also designed St. Francis's Church in Šiška. Koseze Pond, part of the Trail of Remembrance and Comradeship, and part of Tivoli Park are located in the Šiška District.

References

External links

Šiška District on Geopedia
Šiška District homepage 

 
Districts of Ljubljana